Bradbrook is a surname. Notable people with the surname include:

Gail Bradbrook (born 1972), British environmental activist
M. C. Bradbrook (1909–1993), British literary scholar 
Robert Bradbrook (born 1965), British filmmaker and animator
Kate Bradbrook (born 1981), British journalist for the BBC